This is a list of flags, arranged by design, serving as a navigational aid for identifying a given flag.

Solid

Examples:

Charged
While most charged flags are duotone or multicolor, they are referred to by their solid primary color foremost, with their charged symbol's color(s) and symbology following accordingly.

Examples:

Bicolour

Examples:

Tricolour and other tribands

Examples:

Quartered

Examples:

Stripes

Examples:

Border

Examples:

Canton

Examples:

Shape

Circle or sphere

Examples:

Crescent

Examples:

Cross

Examples:

Diamond

Examples:

Spiral
Examples:

Square

Examples:

Star

Examples:

Sun

Triangle

Examples:

Living organism

Animal

Examples:

Person or body part

Examples:

Plant

Examples:

Object

Anchor, boat, or ship

Examples:

Astronomical object

Examples:

Book

Building

Examples:

Headgear

Examples:

Flag

Examples:

Hill, mountain, or rock

Examples:

Map

Examples:

Machine, tool, or instrument

Examples:

Shield or weapon

Examples:

Inscription

Examples:

References

External links
Keyword list at Flags of the World.

 Design